The SRV Dominator is the name given to a series of vehicles used for Reed Timmer, as featured on the Discovery Channel series Storm Chasers (SRV stands for Storm Research Vehicle). In April 2013, Reed Timmer, designer and operator of all three Dominator vehicles joined KFOR-TV's 4WARN Storm Team, all three vehicles collectively referred to by the station as "Dominator 4".

The Dominator
The Dominator was modified from a 2007 Chevrolet Tahoe that was used during the 2008 storm chasing season and debuted in the 2009 chase season. The modifications included adding bulletproof sheet metal and transparent Lexan armor to protect against flying debris near tornadoes, and an external roll cage and racing-style safety harnesses in case of a vehicle roll. The SRV is not designed to intercept (due mainly to a lack of an anchoring system as employed on the TIV 2) but is able to get as close as "humanly possible" to tornadoes. In 2009, a tornado in Aurora, Nebraska unexpectedly strengthened right over the Dominator and blew out the driver's window, when its exterior Lexan window failed to roll up. Reed Timmer and one of his passengers suffered lacerations to the face from flying glass.

During the Off-Season in 2009, the Dominator was upgraded by strengthening bulletproof and LINE-X sheet metal and Lexan Windows. Further upgrades added mid-season include a vertically-scanning radar intended to profile the winds at different heights within a tornado, as well as compressed-air launchers intended to launch wireless parachute probes to gather and transmit data on tornadoes to a chase. At the end of the 2010 Season, the Dominator was sliding while intercepting a mile wide EF-4 Tornado in Wadena, Minnesota nearly ending in a disaster. Early in the 2011 storm season, the Dominator suffered various mechanical issues; such as the Four Wheel Drive not working, the Lexan on the drivers side not fully closing, the braking system and hydraulic system failed before the Super Outbreak, but were later fixed.

Dominator 2

In early 2011, Timmer and other members of TVN purchased a 2011 GMC Yukon XL, which would be the base vehicle for a second Dominator vehicle named Dominator 2. Changes from the first Dominator are said to include a flex fuel engine, improved aerodynamic streamlining thanks to the fully sealed outer shell, higher ride height,  swiveling rear passenger seats, improved hydraulics, and upgraded armor protection as well as anchoring spikes that could allow it to engage tornadoes stronger than those the original Dominator could safely face. Timmer also stated that both vehicles would be used with one going into tornadoes to gather data from inside the funnel while the other would collect data from just outside the tornado, with the intention of comparing the two sets of data. The second generation Dominator features reinforced sheet metal and transparent Lexan has been strengthened with higher-quality steel and an additional LINE-X coating. This shell is firmly affixed to the frame and chassis of the GMC Yukon. The new model retains a roll cage and racing-car safety seats with full-torso belts for added crew protection.

Dominator 2 first saw action during the tornado outbreak sequence of May 21–26, 2011 in central Oklahoma, shown on the fifth season of Storm Chasers.

On May 31, 2013, Dominator 2 was damaged when it intercepted a record breaking multiple-vortex tornado near El Reno. According to KFOR-TV, posts by Reed on Facebook, and as shown in Season 2, episodes 11 and 12 of Tornado Chasers, the hood was ripped off of the vehicle. During the chase, Reed and his team found the wrecked SUV of Mike Bettes and his team from The Weather Channel's Great Tornado Hunt after it had been rolled into a field by a sub-vortex from the main tornado. Joined by members from Oklahoma City's KFOR-TV Channel 4 storm chasing team and first responders like the Oklahoma Highway Patrol, Bettes and his crew were rescued and evacuated to receive medical attention. Reed later learned that TWISTEX founder Tim Samaras, his son Paul, and storm chasing partner Carl Young, were fatalities of the El Reno tornado. 

As of 2023 dominator 2 & 1 will need repair and all three dominators will chase in the 2023 chase season.

Dominator 3

A third Dominator vehicle was completed in late April 2013. This vehicle, named Dominator 3, was built using a Ford Super Duty pickup truck as the base vehicle — the first Dominator vehicle not to use a General Motors vehicle as the base. The vehicle features an electric winch, airbag lowering suspension, hydraulic anchoring spikes, and gull-wing doors (which were augmented with touch-activated actuators in early 2014) for the driver, front and rear passengers. It is also the first Dominator vehicle to utilize a diesel powerplant.

Dominator 3 first saw action during the tornado outbreak of May 18–21, 2013, making three separate intercepts on an EF4 tornado near Shawnee, Oklahoma on May 19.

See also
 Tornado Intercept Vehicle

References

External links
TornadoVideos.Net

Storm chasing
Armoured cars